Nanorana medogensis (common name: Medog spiny frog) is a species of frog in the family Dicroglossidae.
It is endemic to Tibet, China, and only known from near its type locality in Mêdog County in southeastern Tibet, near the Indian border.
It lives in forested streams, and is sometimes also found at the edges of pools and ponds.

References

medogensis
Endemic fauna of Tibet
Frogs of China
Taxonomy articles created by Polbot
Amphibians described in 1999